Opus 76 may refer to:

 Trois grandes études Op.76 of Charles-Valentin Alkan
 6 Variations in D major, Op.76 by Ludwig van Beethoven
 Eight Piano Pieces (Klavierstücke) Op. 76 of Johannes Brahms
 Six Romances sans paroles, Op.76 by Cécile Chaminade 
 Two songs op. 76 by Gabriel Fauré
 The String Quartets, Op. 76 of Joseph Haydn
 4 Lieder Op. 76 by Felix Mendelssohn
 The Wedding Cake caprice Op. 76 by Camille Saint-Saëns
 Four Marches Op. 76 by Robert Schumann
 13 pieces for piano Op. 76 by Jean Sibelius
 Die Tageszeiten Op. 76 by Richard Strauss
 The Storm, op. 76 by Peter Ilyich Tchaikovsky